Radim is a Slavic origin male given name. Derived from the Slavic elements rad care, joy and mer great, famous. The second element has also been associated with mir meaning peace or world. Nicknames are Radya, Radimek, Dima, Radek. Pronounced RAHD-yeem (shortly).

Name Days 
Czech: 25 August
Slovak: 14 January

Famous bearers 
Radim Běleš, Paralympic athlete from the Czech Republic
Radim Bičánek (born 1975), Czech professional ice hockey defenceman
Radim Breite (born 1989), Czech football midfielder
Radim Drejsl (1923–1953), Czech composer, pianist and conductor
Radim Heřman (born 1991), Czech professional ice hockey player
Radim Hladík (born c. 1945), Czech guitarist, most famous for his work with Blue Effect
Radim Holub (born 1975), Czech former football player
Radim Hruška (born 1984), Czech professional ice hockey player
Radim Jančura (born 1972), Czech businessman
Radim Kopecký (born 1985), Czech footballer
Radim Kořínek (born 1973), former competitive bicyclist
Radim Kučera (born 1974), professional footballer
Radim Kucharczyk (born 1979), Czech professional ice hockey player
Radim Nečas (born 1969), Czech football player
Radim Nečas (footballer born 1988), Czech football player
Radim Nepožitek (born 1988), professional Czech football player
Radim Novák (born 1978), Czech football player
Radim Nyč (born 1966), former Czech cross country skier
Radim Ostrčil (born 1989), Czech professional ice hockey player
Radim Řezník (born 1989), Czech football player
Radim Rulík (born 1965), Czech ice hockey coach, head coach of the HC Košice of the Slovak Extraliga
Radim Sablik (born 1974), Czech former football player
Radim Šimek (born 1992), Czech professional ice hockey defenceman
Radim Skuhrovec (born 1974), Czech professional ice hockey defenceman
Radim Uzel (born 1940), Czech sexologist, director of the Society for Family Planning and Sexual Education
Radim Vrbata (born 1981), Czech professional ice hockey player
Radim Wozniak (born 1978), Czech football player

Saints 
Radim Gaudentius, (Svatý Radim, Radzim Gaudenty. (970 – c. 1020) was Archbishop of Gniezno and the first Polish archbishop.

Articles 
List of articles that begin with "Radim"

External links 

Radim on Behind The Name

Slavic masculine given names
Czech masculine given names
Slovak masculine given names